Phu Lam (1961–2014) was the perpetrator in the 2014 Edmonton killings.

Phu Lam may also refer to:
 Phú Lâm, An Giang, a rural commune and village of the Phú Tân District of the An Giang Province in 
 Phu-Lam-Tao, location of engagement during the Sino-French War
 Battle of Phu Lam Tao (23 March 1885), politically significant engagement during the Sino-French War

See also
 
 Phu (disambiguation)
 
 Lam (disambiguation)